The Rajah is a 1919 American short comedy film directed by Hal Roach and starring Harold Lloyd.

Cast
 Harold Lloyd 
 Snub Pollard 
 Bebe Daniels  
 Sammy Brooks
 Lige Conley
 Dee Lampton
 Marie Mosquini
 Fred C. Newmeyer
 Catherine Proudfit
 E.J. Ritter
 Charles Stevenson (as Charles E. Stevenson)
 Chase Thorne
 Noah Young

See also
 Harold Lloyd filmography

References

External links

1919 films
1919 comedy films
1919 short films
Silent American comedy films
American silent short films
American black-and-white films
Films directed by Hal Roach
American comedy short films
1910s American films